Berndt Rainer von Fieandt (26 December 1890 – 28 April 1972) was a Finnish banker and official without party affiliation. 
He was appointed as the Governor of the Bank of Finland in 1955 before being appointed by the President to form a cabinet. He served as the Prime Minister of Finland in 1957 and 1958.

Cabinets
 Von Fieandt Cabinet

References

1890 births
1972 deaths
Politicians from Turku
People from Turku and Pori Province (Grand Duchy of Finland)
Finnish people of German descent
Prime Ministers of Finland
Governors of the Bank of Finland
Finnish bankers